K-Trot in Town is a South Korea reality show program on SBS starring Nam Jin, Joo Hyun-mi and Jang Yoon-jeong as the main cast, along with Boom and Jung Yong-hwa as the show's MCs. The show airs on SBS every Wednesday at 22:00 (KST) starting from March 4, 2020.

Broadcast time moved to 20:55 (KST) beginning September 2, 2020.

Synopsis 
It is a reality program where reputable veteran trot singers travel to various countries to hold busking events. Through the busking events, they aim to introduce the genre of Korean trot to the people in other countries through their performances.

From episodes 7 to 25, the program focuses more on online busking events, due to the COVID-19 pandemic.

Starting from episode 26, the program will go into season 2 and introduce a new project "Last Chance", in the form of an audition show for unknown trot singers, and the cast singers become judges.

Casts

Singers 
 Nam Jin
 Kim Yeon-ja
 Sul Woon-do
 Jin Sung
 Joo Hyun-mi
 Jang Yoon-jeong

MCs 
 Boom (Episode 1-25)
 Jung Yong-hwa (Episode 1-25)

Special MCs 
 Yang Se-hyung (Episode 15-18)
 Jang Do-yeon (Episode 19-22)
 Kim Jong-kook (Episode 38)
 Shin Dong-yup (Episode 41)

Episodes

Rating 
 In this table, the  numbers represent the lowest ratings and the  numbers represent the highest ratings.

Awards and nominations

Notes

References

External links 
  

South Korean variety television shows
South Korean reality television series
South Korean music television shows
2020 South Korean television series debuts
2020 South Korean television series endings
Trot television series
Music competitions in South Korea